The 2011 West Berkshire Council election took place on 5 May 2011 to elect members of West Berkshire Council in Berkshire, England. The whole council was up for election and the Conservative Party stayed in overall control of the council.

Background
At the last election in 2007 the Conservatives won a majority of 20 seats, with 36 councillors, compared to 16 for the Liberal Democrats. By the time of the 2011 election 2 seats were vacant after the death of Liberal Democrat councillor Keith Lock from Mortimer ward and the resignation of Conservative councillor Ellen Crumly from Thatcham Central ward.

Both the Conservatives and Liberal Democrats stood in all 30 wards, while Labour stood in 17 and the Apolitical Democrats and UK Independence Party stood in 2 wards each. There were also 3 independent candidates to make a total of 142 candidates for the 52 seats on the council.

Election result
The Conservatives made a net gain of 3 seats to increase their majority on the council, finishing with 39 councillors, compared to 13 for the Liberal Democrats. The Conservatives picked up seats in Thatcham North and Thatcham South and Crookham from the Liberal Democrats to win the majority of the seats in Thatcham. Meanwhile, Labour failed to win any seats but did increase their share of the vote to just under 10%.

Ward results

By-elections between 2011 and 2015

Hungerford
A by-election was held in Hungerford ward on 15 August 2013 after the death of Conservative councillor David Holtby. The seat was held for the Conservatives by James Podger with a reduced majority of 59 votes over the Liberal Democrats.

Purley on Thames
A by-election was held in Purley on Thames ward on 28 January 2015 after the death of Conservative councillor David Betts. The seat was held for the Conservatives with a majority of 764 votes over the Labour Party.

References

2011
2011 English local elections
2010s in Berkshire